Four vessels of the British Royal Navy have been named HMS Spanker:

 , a 24-gun floating battery of 500 tons (builder's measurement) launched at Deptford in 1794, and deleted from the Navy List on 31 August 1810.
 , an  wooden screw gunboat in service from 1856 to 1874.
 , a  launched in 1889 and converted to a  minesweeper in 1909. Sold for scrap in March 1920.
 , an  launched in 1943 and decommissioned in 1947. She was sold to the Belgian Navy in 1953 and renamed De Brouwer. Broken up at Ghent in 1968.

References

 

Royal Navy ship names